Compilations 1995–2002 is the seventh full-length album by Leeds-based band Hood. This particular record was released on Misplaced Music along with the album Singles Compiled in March 2003.  This record contains previously recorded material found on various artists LPs and singles.

Track listing
 for a moment, lost
 free minds from small towns wanted
 aube remix
 lo band width
 all my friends are dead
 the treacherous mytholm steeps
 sound the cliché klaxons
 i have it in my heart to jump into the ocean
 a shot across the bow
 finger in his ear
 leylines
 two left channels down;who needs enemies
 cross the land
 redundant
 the day to stand alone
 by early light
 song of the sea
 attempts to revive the victim failed
 you should never feel alone in this world
 art without precedent or tradition

References 

2003 compilation albums
Hood (band) albums